"Fixer Upper" is a song from the 2013 Disney animated film Frozen.

Production
Kristen Anderson-Lopez talked about the song's inspiration:

Robert Lopez further elaborated on the song's context within the musical:

Synopsis
The song is sung when Kristoff brings Anna to his "family" - the trolls who treated Anna after Elsa's earlier accident. Kristoff seeks to have Pabbie treat Anna since he fears Elsa has injured her, but the trolls think Anna is his steady girlfriend and hence try to marry the two together. The song starts with the trolls asking Anna what is turning her off from dating Kristoff, like "his unmanly blondness" or his tendency to "tinkle in the woods". Despite Kristoff protesting that Anna is engaged to someone else, the trolls go ahead and try to wed them. They manage to get partway through the vows before the accidental participants cut them off.

Critical reception
IndieWire described the song as an "arbitrary upbeat ode to love's ability to triumph over imperfection so incongruous it's displaced to the middle of Frozen's soundtrack CD". DecentFilms stated, "There’s a double entendre about another type of relationship that is said to be “outside of nature’s laws”: The trolls, singing about Kristoff in the “Fixer-Upper” song, suggest that he has an unnatural relationship with his reindeer Sven. Yes: a bestiality joke in a Disney cartoon". Dawn described it as "the opening from Fraggle Rock".

Other languages 
The Korean language version sung by Jung Young-joo and other members of the cast appeared on the Gaon Music Chart's download sub-chart at 200 after being downloaded 6,000 times; however, it did not appear on the main Gaon Singles Chart.

Charts

Certifications

Reception

2013 songs
Songs from Frozen (franchise)
Songs written by Robert Lopez
Songs written by Kristen Anderson-Lopez